List of rivers of Nevada (U.S. state).

By drainage basin
This list is arranged by drainage basin, with respective tributaries indented under each larger stream's name.

Great Basin
Amargosa River
Carson River
Humboldt River
Little Humboldt River
Reese River
South Fork Humboldt River
Huntington Creek
North Fork Humboldt River
Marys River
Quinn River
Kings River
Thousand Springs Creek
Truckee River
Walker River
East Walker River
West Walker River

Pacific Ocean

Columbia watershed
Columbia River (OR)
Snake River (ID)
Owyhee River
South Fork Owyhee River
Little Owyhee River
Bruneau River
Jarbidge River
Salmon Falls Creek

Colorado watershed
Colorado River
Muddy River
Meadow Valley Wash
White River
Virgin River

Alphabetically
Amargosa River
Bruneau River
Carson River
Colorado River
East Walker River
Humboldt River
Huntington Creek
Jarbidge River
Kings River
Little Humboldt River
Little Owyhee River
Marys River
Meadow Valley Wash
Muddy River
North Fork Humboldt River
Owyhee River
Quinn River
Reese River
Salmon Falls Creek
South Fork Humboldt River
South Fork Owyhee River
Thousand Springs Creek
Tongue Wash
Truckee River
Virgin River
Walker River
West Walker River
White River

See also
List of Lake Tahoe inflow streams
List of rivers in the Great Basin
List of rivers of the United States

External links
Nevada Streamflow Data from the USGS

References
USGS Geographic Names Information Service
USGS Hydrologic Unit Map - State of Nevada (1974)

Nevada
 
Rivers